San Zenone al Lambro is a railway station in Italy. Located on the Milan–Bologna railway, it serves the municipality of San Zenone al Lambro.

Services
San Zenone al Lambro is served by line S1 of the Milan suburban railway network, operated by the Lombard railway company Trenord.

See also
 Milan suburban railway network

References

External links

Railway stations in Lombardy
Milan S Lines stations